Diamond Point is a hamlet in Warren County, New York, United States. Diamond Point has a post office with ZIP code 12824, which opened on September 6, 1877.

References

Hamlets in Warren County, New York
Hamlets in New York (state)